Corneliani is an Italian menswear manufacturer best known for its suits and sportcoats. The company distributes its products in over 70 countries worldwide through multi-brand stores and around 90 single-brand boutiques; Corneliani also manufactures and delivers made-to-measure suits worldwide. Its revenue in 2017 was €110 million. Corneliani has been 55%-owned by Investcorp since 2016.

History
The family-owned firm stretches back to the 1930s when Alfredo Corneliani, set up a craft business making raincoats and coats, which was then put on hold due to the outbreak of World War II.

Alfredo's sons Claudio and Carlalberto later set up Corneliani S.p.A. in Mantua in 1958. In 1985 the company set up Corneliani USA Inc. in New York to distribute its ranges throughout the US and Canada. In 1997 Corneliani opened its flagship store in Via Montenapoleone, in Milan. In 2005 Corneliani received the Leonardo Prize for Quality, awarded by the President of Italy to Italian companies which  promote Italian-made goods. In 2008 Corneliani opened a mono-brand boutique on London’s New Bond Street. In 2012 Corneliani Shanghai Ltd was founded and in 2013  a directly-owned flagship store in  Shanghai was opened. Today, Corneliani employs 600 tailors, seamstresses and pattern makers in Mantua, which is still where its core products are made.

In 2014, Bill de Blasio gave his inaugural speech as mayor of New York in a Corneliani suit, and the tenor Andrea Bocelli got married in Corneliani suit.

In June 2016, the Bahrain-based investment group Investcorp acquired a 55% stake in Corneliani from the company's family members for $50 million, valuing the company around $100 million. Following this purchase, Carlalberto Corneliani stepped down as CEO of the company. In July 2018, Corneliani opened an online retail store in the United States. In November 2018, Luigi Ferrando replaced Paolo Roviera as CEO of the company. In December 2019, Giorgio Brandazza was appointed CEO of Corneliani.

In January 2021, after the coronavirus pandemic negatively affected the company's sales, the Italian Ministry for Economic Development allowed it to keep running until April 15 until a new investor would be found. The Corneliani family still holds 20% of the company.

References

External links 
 

Italian companies established in 1930
Clothing brands of Italy
Clothing companies established in 1930
Italian suit makers
Fashion accessory brands
High fashion brands
Luxury brands
Altagamma members
Menswear designers
Privately held companies of Italy
Design companies established in 1930
Companies based in Mantua